

Soviet Union

Note: In Soviet competitions league calendar mostly stretched from spring through fall, while main rounds of the cup tournament sometimes would follow the fall-spring format.
{|class="wikitable"
|-bgcolor="#efefef"
! Season
! Div.
! Pos.
! Pl.
! W
! D
! L
! GS
! GA
! P
!Soviet Cup
!colspan=2|Other
!Notes
|-
|align=center colspan=14| Pishchevik / Kharchovyk
|-bgcolor=steelblue
|align=center|1938
|align=center rowspan=2|4th(Chempionat URSR z futbolu)
|align=center|5
|align=center|11
|align=center|4
|align=center|4
|align=center|3
|align=center|16
|align=center|16
|align=center|23
|align=center| –
|align=center|CU
|align=center| finals 
|align=center|
|-bgcolor=steelblue
|align=center|1939
|align=center bgcolor=silver|2
|align=center|9
|align=center|6
|align=center|1
|align=center|2
|align=center|
|align=center|
|align=center|22
|align=center| –
|align=center|CU
|align=center| finals
|align=center bgcolor=green|Promoted
|-bgcolor=lightcyan
|align=center|1940
|align=center|2nd(Gruppa B)
|align=center|5
|align=center|26
|align=center|12
|align=center|4
|align=center|10
|align=center|49
|align=center|40
|align=center|28
|align=center| –
|align=center|
|align=center|
|align=center bgcolor=green|Promoted
|-
|align=center colspan=14| Spartak
|-
|align=center|1941
|align=center|1st(Gruppa A)
|align=center|10
|align=center|10
|align=center|3
|align=center|2
|align=center|5
|align=center|16
|align=center|22
|align=center|8
|align=center| –
|align=center|
|align=center|
|align=center|
|-
|align=center|1942
|align=center rowspan=2 colspan=13| During World War II the club was dissolved
|-
|align=center|1943
|-
|align=center colspan=14| Pishchevik / Kharchovyk
|-
|align=center|1944
|align=center colspan=9|no league competition
|align=center|
|align=center|
|align=center|
|align=center|
|-bgcolor=lightcyan
|align=center|1945
|align=center|2nd(Vtoraya Gruppa)
|align=center|7
|align=center|17
|align=center|9
|align=center|1
|align=center|7
|align=center|26
|align=center|22
|align=center|19
|align=center| finals
|align=center|CU
|align=center bgcolor=tan| finals
|align=center|
|-bgcolor=lightcyan
|align=center|1946
|align=center|2nd(Vtoraya Gruppa. Yuzhnaya podruppa)
|align=center|4
|align=center|24
|align=center|12
|align=center|6
|align=center|6
|align=center|43
|align=center|27
|align=center|30
|align=center| –
|align=center|CU
|align=center| finals
|align=center|
|-bgcolor=lightcyan
|align=center|1947
|align=center rowspan=4|2nd(Vtoraya Gruppa. Zona USSR)
|align=center bgcolor=tan|3
|align=center|24
|align=center|14
|align=center|5
|align=center|5
|align=center|45
|align=center|21
|align=center|33
|align=center| finals
|align=center|CU
|align=center bgcolor=silver|Final
|align=center|
|-bgcolor=lightcyan
|align=center|1948
|align=center|5
|align=center|14
|align=center|5
|align=center|5
|align=center|4
|align=center|19
|align=center|18
|align=center|15
|align=center| –
|align=center|CU
|align=center| finals
|align=center|
|-bgcolor=lightcyan
|align=center rowspan=2|1949
|align=center bgcolor=gold|1
|align=center|34
|align=center|23
|align=center|4
|align=center|7
|align=center|81
|align=center|36
|align=center|50
|align=center rowspan=2| finals
|align=center rowspan=2|
|align=center rowspan=2|
|align=center|
|-bgcolor=lightcyan
|align=center bgcolor=tan|3
|align=center|8
|align=center|2
|align=center|3
|align=center|3
|align=center|8
|align=center|7
|align=center|7
|align=center|
|-bgcolor=lightcyan
|align=center|1950
|align=center|2nd(Class B)
|align=center|8
|align=center|26
|align=center|8
|align=center|10
|align=center|8
|align=center|33
|align=center|32
|align=center|26
|align=center| finals
|align=center|
|align=center|
|align=center bgcolor=pink|Relegation play-off
|-
|align=center colspan=14| Metallurg / Metalurh
|-bgcolor=steelblue
|align=center|1951
|align=center rowspan=2|4th(Chempionat URSR z futbolu)
|align=center|5
|align=center|18
|align=center|8
|align=center|5
|align=center|5
|align=center|33
|align=center|17
|align=center|21
|align=center| –
|align=center|CU
|align=center bgcolor=tan| finals
|align=center|
|-bgcolor=steelblue
|align=center|1952
|align=center|8
|align=center|22
|align=center|5
|align=center|6
|align=center|11
|align=center|32
|align=center|37
|align=center|16
|align=center| –
|align=center| –
|align=center| –
|align=center bgcolor=green|Promoted
|-bgcolor=lightcyan
|align=center rowspan=2|1953
|align=center rowspan=3|2nd(Class B)
|align=center bgcolor=tan|3
|align=center|17
|align=center|6
|align=center|8
|align=center|3
|align=center|20
|align=center|12
|align=center|20
|align=center rowspan=2| finals
|align=center rowspan=2|
|align=center rowspan=2|
|align=center|
|-bgcolor=lightcyan
|align=center|7
|align=center|2
|align=center|2
|align=center|0
|align=center|0
|align=center|5
|align=center|1
|align=center|4
|align=center|won its group (7–9)
|-bgcolor=lightcyan
|align=center|1954
|align=center|6
|align=center|22
|align=center|8
|align=center|4
|align=center|10
|align=center|37
|align=center|42
|align=center|20
|align=center| finals
|align=center|
|align=center|
|align=center|
|-
|align=center colspan=14| Pishchevik / Kharchovyk
|-bgcolor=lightcyan
|align=center|1955
|align=center rowspan=3|2nd(Class B)
|align=center|12
|align=center|30
|align=center|11
|align=center|5
|align=center|14
|align=center|39
|align=center|47
|align=center|27
|align=center| finals
|align=center|
|align=center|
|align=center|
|-bgcolor=lightcyan
|align=center|1956
|align=center|15
|align=center|34
|align=center|8
|align=center|10
|align=center|16
|align=center|40
|align=center|57
|align=center|26
|align=center| –
|align=center|
|align=center|
|align=center bgcolor=pink|Relegation play-off
|-bgcolor=lightcyan
|align=center|1957
|align=center|5
|align=center|34
|align=center|16
|align=center|7
|align=center|11
|align=center|65
|align=center|48
|align=center|39
|align=center| finals
|align=center|
|align=center|
|align=center|
|-
|align=center colspan=14| Chernomorets / Chornomorets
|-bgcolor=lightcyan
|align=center|1958
|align=center rowspan=6|2nd(Class B)
|align=center|12
|align=center|30
|align=center|9
|align=center|8
|align=center|13
|align=center|33
|align=center|42
|align=center|26
|align=center| finals
|align=center|
|align=center|
|align=center|
|-bgcolor=lightcyan
|align=center|1959
|align=center|4
|align=center|28
|align=center|15
|align=center|4
|align=center|9
|align=center|40
|align=center|25
|align=center|34
|align=center|–
|align=center|
|align=center|
|align=center|
|-bgcolor=lightcyan
|align=center|1960
|align=center|4
|align=center|32
|align=center|19
|align=center|4
|align=center|9
|align=center|63
|align=center|31
|align=center|42
|align=center| finals
|align=center|
|align=center|
|align=center|
|-bgcolor=lightcyan
|align=center|1961
|align=center bgcolor=gold|1
|align=center|34
|align=center|26
|align=center|5
|align=center|3
|align=center|66
|align=center|23
|align=center|57
|align=center| finals
|align=center|
|align=center|
|align=center bgcolor=gold|won play-off vs SKA Odessa
|-bgcolor=lightcyan
|align=center rowspan=2|1962
|align=center bgcolor=gold|1
|align=center|24
|align=center|13
|align=center|8
|align=center|3
|align=center|48
|align=center|20
|align=center|34
|align=center rowspan=2| finals
|align=center rowspan=2|
|align=center rowspan=2|
|align=center|advanced to final
|-bgcolor=lightcyan
|align=center bgcolor=silver|2
|align=center|10
|align=center|4
|align=center|3
|align=center|3
|align=center|13
|align=center|9
|align=center|11
|align=center|
|-bgcolor=lightcyan
|align=center|1963
|align=center rowspan=3|2nd(Class A. Vtoraya gruppa)
|align=center|6
|align=center|34
|align=center|13
|align=center|13
|align=center|8
|align=center|39
|align=center|31
|align=center|39
|align=center| finals
|align=center|
|align=center|
|align=center|
|-bgcolor=lightcyan
|align=center rowspan=2|1964
|align=center bgcolor=silver|2
|align=center|24
|align=center|11
|align=center|7
|align=center|6
|align=center|27
|align=center|21
|align=center|29
|align=center rowspan=2| finals
|align=center rowspan=2|
|align=center rowspan=2|
|align=center|advanced to final
|-bgcolor=lightcyan
|align=center|4
|align=center|14
|align=center|8
|align=center|3
|align=center|3
|align=center|25
|align=center|14
|align=center|19
|align=center bgcolor=green|Promoted
|-
|align=center|1965
|align=center rowspan=6|1st(Class A. Pervaya Gruppa)
|align=center|14
|align=center|32
|align=center|9
|align=center|8
|align=center|15
|align=center|35
|align=center|43
|align=center|26
|align=center| finals
|align=center|
|align=center|
|align=center|
|-
|align=center|1966
|align=center|14
|align=center|36
|align=center|10
|align=center|13
|align=center|13
|align=center|29
|align=center|36
|align=center|33
|align=center bgcolor=tan| finals
|align=center|
|align=center|
|align=center|
|-
|align=center|1967
|align=center|18
|align=center|36
|align=center|8
|align=center|11
|align=center|17
|align=center|25
|align=center|46
|align=center|27
|align=center| finals
|align=center|
|align=center|
|align=center|
|-
|align=center|1968
|align=center|8
|align=center|38
|align=center|11
|align=center|16
|align=center|11
|align=center|47
|align=center|49
|align=center|38
|align=center| finals
|align=center|
|align=center|
|align=center|
|-
|align=center rowspan=2|1969
|align=center|7
|align=center|18
|align=center|5
|align=center|7
|align=center|6
|align=center|14
|align=center|17
|align=center|17
|align=center rowspan=2| finals
|align=center rowspan=2|
|align=center rowspan=2|
|align=center|
|-
|align=center|8
|align=center|14
|align=center|5
|align=center|3
|align=center|6
|align=center|11
|align=center|13
|align=center|13
|align=center|Places 1-14 group
|-
|align=center|1970
|align=center|1st(Class A. Vysshaya Gruppa)
|align=center|15
|align=center|32
|align=center|8
|align=center|10
|align=center|14
|align=center|25
|align=center|38
|align=center|26
|align=center| finals
|align=center|
|align=center|
|align=center bgcolor=pink|Relegated
|-bgcolor=LightCyan
|align=center|1971
|align=center rowspan="3"|2nd(Pervaya Liga)
|align=center bgcolor=tan|3
|align=center|42
|align=center|21
|align=center|11
|align=center|10
|align=center|56
|align=center|33
|align=center|53
|align=center| finals
|align=center|
|align=center|
|align=center|
|-bgcolor=LightCyan
|align=center|1972
|align=center bgcolor=tan|3
|align=center|38
|align=center|20
|align=center|8
|align=center|10
|align=center|67
|align=center|36
|align=center|48
|align=center| finals
|align=center|CU
|align=center bgcolor=tan| finals
|align=center|
|-bgcolor=LightCyan
|align=center|1973
|align=center bgcolor=gold|1
|align=center|38
|align=center|24
|align=center|6
|align=center|8
|align=center|83
|align=center|38
|align=center|52
|align=center| finals
|align=center|CU
|align=center| finals
|align=center bgcolor=green|Promoted
|-
|align=center|1974
|align=center rowspan="14"|1st(Vysshaya Liga)
|align=center bgcolor=tan|3
|align=center|30
|align=center|12
|align=center|11
|align=center|7
|align=center|35
|align=center|31
|align=center|35
|align=center| finals
|align=center|
|align=center|
|align=center|
|-
|align=center|1975
|align=center|12
|align=center|30
|align=center|8
|align=center|10
|align=center|12
|align=center|27
|align=center|35
|align=center|26
|align=center| finals
|align=center|UC
|align=center|1st round
|align=center|
|-
|align=center rowspan="2"|1976
|align=center|10
|align=center|15
|align=center|4
|align=center|7
|align=center|4
|align=center|14
|align=center|18
|align=center|15
|align=center rowspan="2"| finals
|align=center rowspan="2"|
|align=center rowspan="2"|
|align=center|spring half
|-
|align=center|9
|align=center|15
|align=center|7
|align=center|1
|align=center|7
|align=center|14
|align=center|20
|align=center|15
|align=center|fall half
|-
|align=center|1977
|align=center|7
|align=center|30
|align=center|11
|align=center|8
|align=center|11
|align=center|33
|align=center|41
|align=center|30
|align=center|1/16 finals
|align=center|
|align=center|
|align=center|
|-
|align=center|1978
|align=center|7
|align=center|30
|align=center|12
|align=center|10
|align=center|8
|align=center|41
|align=center|26
|align=center|32 (−2)
|align=center|1/8 finals
|align=center|
|align=center|
|align=center|Drawn games over limit
|-
|align=center|1979
|align=center|11
|align=center|34
|align=center|10
|align=center|11
|align=center|13
|align=center|32
|align=center|37
|align=center|28 (−3)
|align=center|Group stage
|align=center|
|align=center|
|align=center|Drawn games over limit
|-
|align=center|1980
|align=center|7
|align=center|34
|align=center|13
|align=center|9
|align=center|12
|align=center|37
|align=center|37
|align=center|35
|align=center|Group stage
|align=center|
|align=center|
|align=center|
|-
|align=center|1981
|align=center|11
|align=center|34
|align=center|11
|align=center|9
|align=center|14
|align=center|36
|align=center|44
|align=center|31
|align=center|1/4 finals
|align=center|
|align=center|
|align=center|
|-
|align=center|1982
|align=center|10
|align=center|34
|align=center|11
|align=center|11
|align=center|12
|align=center|30
|align=center|36
|align=center|32 (−1)
|align=center|Group stage
|align=center|
|align=center|
|align=center|Drawn games over limit
|-
|align=center|1983
|align=center|8
|align=center|34
|align=center|16
|align=center|5
|align=center|13
|align=center|44
|align=center|46
|align=center|37
|align=center|1/8 finals
|align=center|
|align=center|
|align=center|
|-
|align=center|1984
|align=center|4
|align=center|34
|align=center|16
|align=center|9
|align=center|9
|align=center|49
|align=center|38
|align=center|41
|align=center|1/4 finals
|align=center|
|align=center|
|align=center|Cup tournament switched format
|-
|align=center|1985
|align=center|15
|align=center|34
|align=center|11
|align=center|7
|align=center|16
|align=center|44
|align=center|65
|align=center|29
|align=center|1/8 finals
|align=center|UC
|align=center|2nd round
|align=center|Relegation tournament
|-
|align=center|1986
|align=center|15
|align=center|30
|align=center|8
|align=center|7
|align=center|15
|align=center|29
|align=center|37
|align=center|23
|align=center|1/4 finals
|align=center|
|align=center|
|align=center bgcolor=red|Relegated
|-bgcolor=LightCyan
|align=center|1987
|align=center|2nd(Pervaya Liga)
|align=center bgcolor=gold|1
|align=center|42
|align=center|25
|align=center|12
|align=center|5
|align=center|68
|align=center|31
|align=center|62
|align=center|1/16 finals
|align=center|
|align=center|
|align=center bgcolor=green|Promoted
|-
|align=center|1988
|align=center rowspan="4"|1st(Vysshaya Liga)
|align=center|13
|align=center|30
|align=center|9
|align=center|6
|align=center|15
|align=center|24
|align=center|37
|align=center|24
|align=center|1/64 finals
|align=center|
|align=center|
|align=center|
|-
|align=center|1989
|align=center|6
|align=center|30
|align=center|11
|align=center|9
|align=center|10
|align=center|40
|align=center|41
|align=center|31
|align=center|1/16 finals
|align=center|
|align=center|
|align=center|
|-
|align=center|1990
|align=center|9
|align=center|24
|align=center|8
|align=center|3
|align=center|13
|align=center|23
|align=center|29
|align=center|19
|align=center|1/8 finals
|align=center|UC
|align=center|2nd round
|align=center|
|-
|align=center|1991
|align=center|4
|align=center|30
|align=center|10
|align=center|16
|align=center|4
|align=center|39
|align=center|24
|align=center|36
|align=center|1/4 finals
|align=center|
|align=center|
|align=center|
|-
|align=center|1992
|align=center colspan=9|No competition
|align=center|1/4 finalsCup
|align=center|
|align=center|
|align=center|
|}
Notes:Scheduled to play against PFC CSKA Moscow, Chornomorets withdrew from the Soviet Cup in 1992.

Ukraine
{|class="wikitable"
|-bgcolor="#efefef"
! Season
! Div.
! Pos.
! Pl.
! W
! D
! L
! GS
! GA
! P
!Domestic Cup
!colspan=2|Europe
!Notes
|-
|align=center|1992
|align=center rowspan="7"|1st(Top League)
|align=center|5
|align=center|18
|align=center|9
|align=center|7
|align=center|2
|align=center|30
|align=center|12
|align=center|35
|align=center bgcolor=gold|Winner
|align=center|
|align=center|
|align=center|
|-
|align=center|1992–93
|align=center bgcolor=#A67D3D|3
|align=center|30
|align=center|17
|align=center|4
|align=center|9
|align=center|31
|align=center|12
|align=center|38
|align=center|1/16 finals
|align=center|CWC
|align=center|1st round
|align=center|
|-
|align=center|1993–94
|align=center bgcolor=#A67D3D|3
|align=center|34
|align=center|20
|align=center|8
|align=center|6
|align=center|52
|align=center|23
|align=center|48
|align=center bgcolor=gold|Winner
|align=center|
|align=center|
|align=center|
|-
|align=center|1994–95
|align=center bgcolor=silver|2
|align=center|34
|align=center|22
|align=center|7
|align=center|5
|align=center|62
|align=center|29
|align=center|73
|align=center bgcolor=#A67D3D|1/2 finals
|align=center|CWC
|align=center|1st round
|align=center|
|-
|align=center|1995–96
|align=center bgcolor=silver|2
|align=center|34
|align=center|22
|align=center|7
|align=center|5
|align=center|56
|align=center|25
|align=center|73
|align=center|1/16 finals
|align=center|UC
|align=center|2nd round
|align=center|
|-
|align=center|1996–97
|align=center|7
|align=center|30
|align=center|12
|align=center|6
|align=center|12
|align=center|36
|align=center|31
|align=center|42
|align=center|1/4 finals
|align=center|UC
|align=center|1st round
|align=center|
|-
|align=center|1997–98
|align=center|15
|align=center|30
|align=center|8
|align=center|8
|align=center|14
|align=center|31
|align=center|39
|align=center|32
|align=center|1/4 finals
|align=center|
|align=center|
|align=center bgcolor=pink|Relegated
|-bgcolor=LightCyan
|align=center|1998–99
|align=center|2nd(First League)
|align=center bgcolor= silver|2
|align=center|38
|align=center|25
|align=center|4
|align=center|9
|align=center|77
|align=center|38
|align=center|79
|align=center|1/64 finals
|align=center|
|align=center|
|align=center bgcolor=lightgreen|Promoted
|-
|align=center|1999–00
|align=center|1st(Top League)
|align=center|15
|align=center|30
|align=center|6
|align=center|8
|align=center|16
|align=center|20
|align=center|50
|align=center|26
|align=center|1/16 finals
|align=center|
|align=center|
|align=center bgcolor=pink|Relegated
|-bgcolor=LightCyan
|align=center|2000–01
|align=center rowspan="2"|2nd(First League)
|align=center|6
|align=center|34
|align=center|17
|align=center|6
|align=center|11
|align=center|44
|align=center|28
|align=center|57
|align=center|1/8 finals
|align=center|
|align=center|
|align=center|
|-bgcolor=LightCyan
|align=center|2001–02
|align=center bgcolor= silver|2
|align=center|34
|align=center|21
|align=center|4
|align=center|9
|align=center|48
|align=center|21
|align=center|67
|align=center|1/16 finals
|align=center|
|align=center|
|align=center bgcolor=lightgreen|Promoted
|-
|align=center|2002–03
|align=center rowspan="6"|1st(Top League)
|align=center|8
|align=center|30
|align=center|10
|align=center|4
|align=center|16
|align=center|31
|align=center|45
|align=center|34
|align=center|1/16 finals
|align=center|
|align=center|
|align=center|
|-
|align=center|2003–04
|align=center|5
|align=center|30
|align=center|11
|align=center|12
|align=center|7
|align=center|38
|align=center|33
|align=center|45
|align=center bgcolor=#A67D3D|1/2 finals
|align=center|
|align=center|
|align=center|
|-
|align=center|2004–05
|align=center|6
|align=center|30
|align=center|12
|align=center|6
|align=center|12
|align=center|29
|align=center|29
|align=center|42
|align=center|1/16 finals
|align=center|
|align=center|
|align=center|
|-
|align=center|2005–06
|align=center bgcolor=#A67D3D|3
|align=center|30
|align=center|13
|align=center|6
|align=center|11
|align=center|36
|align=center|31
|align=center|45
|align=center|1/16 finals
|align=center|
|align=center|
|align=center|
|-
|align=center|2006–07
|align=center|6
|align=center|30
|align=center|11
|align=center|8
|align=center|11
|align=center|36
|align=center|33
|align=center|41
|align=center|1/16 finals
|align=center|UC
|align=center|1st round
|align=center|
|-
|align=center|2007–08
|align=center|7
|align=center|30
|align=center|11
|align=center|5
|align=center|14
|align=center|27
|align=center|33
|align=center|38
|align=center bgcolor=#A67D3D|1/2 finals
|align=center|IC
|align=center|3rd round
|align=center|
|-
|align=center|2008–09
|align=center rowspan="2"|1st(Premier League)
|align=center|10
|align=center|30
|align=center|12
|align=center|2
|align=center|16
|align=center|34
|align=center|42
|align=center|32
|align=center|1/16 finals
|align=center|
|align=center|
|align=center|(−6) disciplinaryCAS
|-
|align=center|2009–10
|align=center|15
|align=center|30
|align=center|5
|align=center|9
|align=center|16
|align=center|21
|align=center|44
|align=center|24
|align=center|1/16 finals
|align=center|   
|align=center|   
|align=center bgcolor=pink|Relegated
|-bgcolor=LightCyan
|align=center|2010–11
|align=center|2nd(First League)
|align=center bgcolor= silver|2
|align=center|34
|align=center|18
|align=center|11
|align=center|5
|align=center|53
|align=center|26
|align=center|65
|align=center|1/16 finals
|align=center|
|align=center|
|align=center bgcolor=lightgreen|Promoted
|-
|align=center|2011–12
|align=center rowspan="8"|1st(Premier League)
|align=center|9
|align=center|30
|align=center|10
|align=center|7
|align=center|13
|align=center|32
|align=center|42
|align=center|37
|align=center|1/4 finals
|align=center|   
|align=center|   
|align=center|    
|-
|align=center|2012–13
|align=center| 6
|align=center|30
|align=center|12
|align=center|7
|align=center|11
|align=center|32
|align=center|36
|align=center|43
|align=center bgcolor= silver|Runners up
|align=center|   
|align=center|   
|align=center|   
|-
|align=center|2013–14
|align=center|5
|align=center|28
|align=center|12
|align=center|10
|align=center|6
|align=center|30
|align=center|22
|align=center|46
|align=center bgcolor=#A67D3D|1/2 finals
|align=center|EL
|align=center|1/32 finals
|align=center|
|-
| align="center" |2014–15
| align="center" |11
| align="center" |25
| align="center" |3
| align="center" |11
| align="center" |11
| align="center" |15
| align="center" |31
| align="center" |20
| align="center" |1/8 finals
| align="center" |EL
| align="center" |3rd qual round
| align="center" |
|-
| align="center" |2015–16
| align="center" |11 
| align="center" |26 	
| align="center" |4 	
| align="center" |10 	
| align="center" |12 	
| align="center" |20 	
| align="center" |39 	 	
| align="center" |22
| align="center" |1/8 finals
| align="center" |
| align="center" |
| align="center" |
|-
| align="center" |2016–17
| align="center" |6 
| align="center" |32 	
| align="center" |10 	
| align="center" |8 	
| align="center" |14 	
| align="center" |25 		
| align="center" |37 		
| align="center" |38
| align="center" |1/16 finals
| align="center" |
| align="center" |
| align="center" |
|-
| align="center" |2017–18
| align="center" |11 
| align="center" |32 	
| align="center" |6
| align="center" |11
| align="center" |15
| align="center" |26
| align="center" |49
| align="center" |29
| align="center" | finals
| align="center" |
| align="center" |
| align="center" |Relegation play-off
|-
| align="center" |2018–19
| align="center" |11
| align="center" |32
| align="center" |8
| align="center" |7
| align="center" |17
| align="center" |31
| align="center" |49
| align="center" |31
| align="center" | finals
| align="center" |
| align="center" |
| align="center" bgcolor=pink|Relegation play-off
|-bgcolor=LightCyan
| align="center" |2019–20
| align="center" rowspan=2|2nd(First League)
| align="center" |10
| align="center" |30
| align="center" |10
| align="center" |9
| align="center" |11
| align="center" |40
| align="center" |37
| align="center" |39
| align="center" | finals
| align="center" |
| align="center" |
| align="center" |
|-bgcolor=LightCyan
| align="center" |2020–21
| align="center" bgcolor=silver|2
| align="center" |30
| align="center" |18
| align="center" |7
| align="center" |5
| align="center" |45
| align="center" |23
| align="center" |61
| align="center" | finals
| align="center" |
| align="center" |
|align=center bgcolor=lightgreen|Promoted
|-
| align="center" |2021–22
| align="center" rowspan=3|1st(Premier League)
| align="center" |13
| align="center" |18
| align="center" |3
| align="center" |5
| align="center" |10
| align="center" |20
| align="center" |40
| align="center" |14
| align="center" | finals
| align="center" |
| align="center" |
| align="center" |
|-
| align="center" |2022–23
| align="center" |
| align="center" |
| align="center" |
| align="center" |
| align="center" |
| align="center" |
| align="center" |
| align="center" |
| align="center" |
| align="center" |
| align="center" |
| align="center" |
|}

Notes:on decision of Court of Arbitration for Sport about Đorđe Inđić

Notes

References

 
Chornomorets Odesa
Seasons